A locally convex topological vector space (TVS)  is B-complete or a Ptak space if every subspace  is closed in the weak-* topology on  (i.e.  or ) whenever  is closed in  (when  is given the subspace topology from ) for each equicontinuous subset .

Characterizations 

Throughout this section,  will be a locally convex topological vector space (TVS). 

The following are equivalent: 
 is a Ptak space.
Every continuous nearly open linear map of  into any locally convex space  is a topological homomorphism.

The following are equivalent: 
 is -complete.
Every continuous biunivocal, nearly open linear map of  into any locally convex space  is a TVS-isomorphism.

Properties 

Every Ptak space is complete.  However, there exist complete Hausdorff locally convex space that are not Ptak spaces.

Let  be a nearly open linear map whose domain is dense in a -complete space  and whose range is a locally convex space . If  is injective or if  is a Ptak space then  is an open map.

Examples and sufficient conditions 

There exist Br-complete spaces that are not B-complete.  

Every Fréchet space is a Ptak space.  The strong dual of a reflexive Fréchet space is a Ptak space.

Every closed vector subspace of a Ptak space (resp. a Br-complete space) is a Ptak space (resp. a -complete space). and every Hausdorff quotient of a Ptak space is a Ptak space.  
If every Hausdorff quotient of a TVS  is a Br-complete space then  is a B-complete space.  

If  is a locally convex space such that there exists a continuous nearly open surjection  from a Ptak space, then  is a Ptak space.  

If a TVS  has a closed hyperplane that is B-complete (resp. Br-complete) then  is B-complete (resp. Br-complete).

See also

Notes

References

Bibliography

External links 

 Nuclear space at ncatlab

Topological vector spaces